Julius Cecil Holmes (April 24, 1899 – July 16, 1968) was a US government official who served as Ambassador to Iran. 

Holmes was born in Pleasanton, Kansas and graduated from the University of Kansas in 1922.

In 1942, Holmes served as the Executive Officer for the U.S. Joint Chiefs of Staff. 
In order to set the forces committed to Operation Torch, the Allied invasion of French North Africa, he landed with Gen. Mark W. Clark and Gen. Lyman Lemnitzer near Cherchell, Algeria, to meet secretly and set an accord with french resisters (as Jose Aboulker, Bernard Karsenty, Henri d'Astier de La Vigerie ) and officers (Gen. Charles Mast, Lt-Cl Germain Jousse in order to prevent the reaction of French Vychist armed forces and civil powers, paving the way for the fast success of the November 8, 1942 landing of Allied Forces in Algiers, and then in the remaining of Algeria and in Morocco, that Winston Churchill called "the end of the beginning".  That same year (and until 1944) he served in the Liaison section of Allied Forces Headquarters (AFHQ) In 1944 he served as Deputy G-5 for the Supreme Headquarters Allied Expeditionary Force (SHAEF) while simultaneously acting as the Assistant Secretary of State until 1945. He was promoted to Brigadier General, United States Army in 1943.

In 1953, Holmes was Minister at the American Embassy in London. Two years later, in 1955, Holmes served as Ambassador to Iran, a position he reprised from 1961 to 1965. From 1956 to 1959 Holmes was the Special Assistant to the Secretary of State for NATO Affairs. From 1959 to 1961 Holmes served as Consul General to Hong Kong.

See also
 Robert Rossow, Jr.

References

External links
 Papers of Julius C. Holmes, Dwight D. Eisenhower Presidential Library

Ambassadors of the United States to Iran
Consuls general of the United States in Hong Kong and Macau
United States Army generals
People from Pleasanton, Kansas
1899 births
1968 deaths
United States Assistant Secretaries of State
University of Kansas alumni
20th-century American diplomats